People's Party is a political party in the Republic of Malawi that was founded in 2011 by Joyce Banda, Vice-President of Malawi from May 2009 to April 2012, and President from 7 April 2012 to 2014.

Joyce Banda created the People's Party after being expelled from the ruling Democratic Progressive Party (DPP) when she refused to endorse President Bingu wa Mutharika's younger brother Peter Mutharika as the successor to the presidency for the 2014 general election.

Initial Problems 
During 2011, the Registrar refused to register the organization as an official political party because its name sounded too similar to others in the country. Eventually the high court dismissed this and ordered that the party be registered within fourteen days.

Party Leaders
Joyce Banda: 2012– present

Electoral history

Presidential elections

National Assembly elections

References 

Liberal parties in Africa
Political parties in Malawi
Political parties established in 2011
2011 establishments in Malawi